Walter Llewellyn Rees (18 June 1901 – 7 January 1994) was an English actor.

Career

His television roles included appearances on Doctor Who (in the serial The Deadly Assassin (1976) playing the assassinated Time Lord President), The Brothers, Inspector Morse, Doomwatch and Coronation Street. He appeared in a number of films such as The Dresser, Withnail and I, A Fish Called Wanda and Splitting Heirs.

In The Dresser, Rees played an aging member of a British touring company. The play that the film was based on had its genesis in the touring company of actor/manager Sir Donald Wolfit, whom Rees had toured with in the 1940 and 1950s. He played a guest role in ATV soap opera Crossroads in 1978 as Godfrey King.

Rees was also active in the political end of the theatre serving as General Secretary, Actors' Equity Association 1940–46; Secretary, Federation of Theatre Unions 1944–46; Governor, Old Vic 1945–47; Drama Director, Arts Council of Great Britain 1947–49; Administrator, Old Vic 1949–51; Administrator, Arts Theatre 1951–52.

Personal life

When he was 60 years old, Rees married actress Madeleine Newbury.

Death
He died on 7 January 1994, at the age of 92.

Filmography

References

External links

1901 births
1994 deaths
20th-century English male actors
English male film actors
English male stage actors
English male television actors
English people of Welsh descent
General Secretaries of Equity (trade union)